Half-handed Cloud is an American recording project, based in Helsinki, Finland since 2015. It was started in 1999 as a one-man band by John Ringhofer, who created the band name based on an occurrence in the Old Testament. The majority of Half-handed Cloud's albums have been released on Asthmatic Kitty Records. His previous band was Wookieback with Matthew Vollmer and Brandon Buckner. Ringhofer, a vegetarian, lived rent free in return for his custodial services at a church in Berkeley, CA for a decade. John Ringhofer has collaborated with Sufjan Stevens on Half-handed Cloud's What's The Remedy? 7-inch, among other works such as Thy Is A Word And Feet Need Lamps, and 2014's Flying Scroll Flight Control. Daniel Smith of Danielson and Sounds Familyre is credited for helping to establish Half-handed Cloud's early days, and has been a frequent collaborator with John Ringhofer.

Discography

Albums 
Learning About Your Scale, 1999
We Haven't Just Been Told, We Have Been Loved, 2002
Thy Is a Word and Feet Need Lamps, 2005
Halos & Lassos, 2006
As Stowaways in Cabinets of Surf, We Live-out in Our Members a Kind of Rebirth]], 2010
Flying Scroll Flight Control, 2014
I Don't Have A Bib, 2018
Flutterama, 2022

EPs 
I'm So Sheepy, 2000
What's the Remedy?, 2005
Harp That's Hung-Up in the Tree, 2006
Winding Currents on a Spool, 2007
DOVE, 2011
Blood Brothers, 2012
Foiled EP N°1, 2015
Foiled EP N°2, 2015
Jiminy Circuits, 2016

Compilation albums 
 Cut Me Down & Count My Rings, 2009
 Gathered Out of Thin Air, 2019

In popular culture
The band's 2015 song Nativity Costume (2000 Year's Eve) was remixed in the 2019 video game Hypnospace Outlaw.

References

External links 
 

Half-handed Cloud page at Sounds Familyre
Half-handed Cloud page at Asthmatic Kitty
Asthmatic Kitty Records
Video for Half-handed Cloud

Rock music groups from California
Musical groups from Berkeley, California
Asthmatic Kitty artists